The following is a list of state highways in the U.S. state of Louisiana designated in the 3000–3049 range.


Louisiana Highway 3000

Louisiana Highway 3000 (LA 3000) runs  in a north–south direction from a local road in Ramah to LA 76 west of Rosedale.  The highway connects LA 76 to I-10 at Exit 135.  The route has a spur that travels  from LA 3000 west to a bridge at the Atchafalaya Basin Floodway levee.

Louisiana Highway 3001

Louisiana Highway 3002

Louisiana Highway 3002 (LA 3002) runs  in a north–south direction along Range Avenue from LA 1034 to the junction of US 190 and LA 16 in Denham Springs, Livingston Parish.

Louisiana Highway 3003

Louisiana Highway 3003 (LA 3003) runs  in an east–west direction from LA 1032 to LA 16 in Denham Springs, Livingston Parish.

From the west, LA 3003 begins at LA 1032 (4-H Club Road) just south of the latter's intersection with US 190.  It heads southeast on Rushing Road and intersects LA 3002 (South Range Avenue).  LA 3003 continues along the north side of I-12 to its terminus at LA 16 (Pete's Highway).
    
LA 3003 is an undivided two-lane highway for its entire length.

Louisiana Highway 3005

Louisiana Highway 3006

Louisiana Highway 3006 (LA 3006) runs  in an east–west direction along Lavey Lane from LA 19 to LA 67 in Baker, East Baton Rouge Parish.

Louisiana Highway 3007

Louisiana Highway 3008

Louisiana Highway 3008 (LA 3008) runs  in a north–south direction along Dorcheat Road from LA 160 to a bridge over Flat Lick Bayou through Webster Parish.

Louisiana Highway 3009

Louisiana Highway 3011

Louisiana Highway 3011 (LA 3011) runs  in a north–south direction along Grand Caillou Road in Dulac, Terrebonne Parish.

The route begins at a point where Grand Caillou Road transitions from parish to state maintenance and proceeds northeast along the east bank of Bayou Caillou.  It then turns to the east and terminates at LA 57 (Bayou Sale Road).  It is an undivided, two-lane highway for its entire length.  LA 57 continues south toward Cocodrie and also straight ahead and to the north across Bayou Dulac toward Houma.

LA 3011 was created with the 1955 Louisiana Highway renumbering, and its route has remained the same to the present day.

Louisiana Highway 3012

Louisiana Highway 3014

Louisiana Highway 3014 (LA 3014) runs  in a southwest to northeast direction from US 371 to LA 160 in Cotton Valley, Webster Parish.

The route heads northeast from US 371 along Humble Avenue.  It then turns north onto Church Street, east onto Resident Street, and finally north onto Main Street to its terminus at LA 160.

LA 3014 is an undivided two-lane highway for its entire length.

Louisiana Highway 3015

Louisiana Highway 3017

Louisiana Highway 3017 (LA 3017) runs  in a general northwest to southeast direction from LA 18 in Harvey to LA 23 in Belle Chasse.

LA 3017 serves the industrial corridor situated along two sections of the Gulf Intracoastal Waterway and connects it with two major highways in the area, US 90 Bus. and LA 23.  The route heads southeast on Peters Road from LA 18 (4th Street) and parallels the portion of the waterway that follows the Harvey Canal.  Within a short distance, it intersects the ramps leading to US 90 Bus. (Westbank Expressway).  Later, the route crosses Lapalco Boulevard, a main area thoroughfare, and passes Boomtown Casino.  Shortly afterward, LA 3017 crosses Bayou Barataria from Jefferson Parish into Plaquemines Parish and turns northeast onto Engineers Road.  It proceeds until reaching its junction with LA 23 in Belle Chasse.

Louisiana Highway 3018

Louisiana Highway 3018 (LA 3018) runs  along Destrehan Avenue in Harvey, Jefferson Parish.

The route begins at an intersection with the US 90 Business (Westbank Expressway) service roads below the high-level Harvey Canal bridge and heads north, running west of and parallel to the canal, to LA 18 (4th Street).  LA 3018 serves the La DOTD Harvey Tunnel Maintenance Yard and is an undivided, two-lane highway for its entire length.

In the pre-1955 state highway system, LA 3018 was designated as State Route C-2052.  LA 3018 was created with the 1955 Louisiana Highway renumbering, and until the 2000s, its route extended  further south on Destrehan Avenue to Patriot Street.

Louisiana Highway 3019

Louisiana Highway 3019 (LA 3019) runs  in an east–west direction primarily along Veterans Highway in New Orleans (Orleans Parish).

The route begins on the east side of the 17th Street Canal bridge at the Jefferson–Orleans parish line and proceeds east along Veterans Highway, the continuation of Veterans Memorial Boulevard in New Orleans.  Eastbound traffic turns south onto Pontchartrain Boulevard and immediately enters an interchange with I-10 and I-610.  Westbound traffic utilizes parallel West End Boulevard.  LA 3019 is a divided, six-lane highway on Veterans Highway and a divided, four-lane highway on Pontchartrain and West End Boulevards.

LA 3019 is a vestige of the original plans for the Pontchartrain Expressway and its connection to Veterans Highway, which at the time ended just west of the parish line in Metairie.  In the pre-1955 state highway system, the planned Pontchartrain Expressway, Greater New Orleans Bridge (now known as the Crescent City Connection), and Westbank Expressway were given the collective designation of State Route C-2200.  This became LA 3019 with the 1955 Louisiana Highway renumbering, and the majority of the route was later incorporated into I-10 and US 90 Business.  The remaining segment connecting Veterans Memorial Boulevard in Metairie with the I-10/I-610 interchange retains the LA 3019 designation.

Louisiana Highway 3020

Louisiana Highway 3021

Louisiana Highway 3021 (LA 3021) runs  in a north–south direction along Elysian Fields Avenue in New Orleans (Orleans Parish).

The route begins at North Claiborne Avenue, a junction with LA 39 and LA 46, and proceeds north along Elysian Fields Avenue.  LA 3021 engages in interchanges with both I-10 and I-610, passing over the Norfolk Southern Railway (NS) tracks in between, before ending at US 90 (Gentilly Boulevard).  It is a six-lane, divided highway for its entire length.

LA 3021 is a vestige of the original plans for the Eastern Expressway, incorporated into the route for I-10 by the time of its construction in the 1960s, which would have connected Eastern New Orleans with North Claiborne Avenue via an expressway in the median of Elysian Fields Avenue.  In the pre-1955 state highway system, the proposed route was given the temporary designation of State Route C-2200, changed to LA 3021 in the 1955 Louisiana Highway renumbering.  The Elysian Fields Avenue segment, as well as a segment of Morrison Road that is now LA 1253, were ultimately left out of the expressway plans.  Though never connected, both retained the LA 3021 designation until the latter segment was given its own number in 2002.

Louisiana Highway 3024

Louisiana Highway 3025

Louisiana Highway 3032

Louisiana Highway 3033

Louisiana Highway 3034

Louisiana Highway 3034 (LA 3034) runs  in an east–west direction from LA 408 to the junction of LA 37 and LA 64 in Central, East Baton Rouge Parish.

The route heads southeast from LA 408 (Hooper Road) along Sullivan Road.  It then turns east onto Wax Road, which transitions onto Magnolia Bridge Road.  The route ends at an intersection with LA 37/LA 64 (Greenwell Springs Road) just west of the Amite River.

LA 3034 is an undivided two-lane highway for its entire length.

Louisiana Highway 3036

Louisiana Highway 3037

Louisiana Highway 3038

Louisiana Highway 3039

Louisiana Highway 3040

Louisiana Highway 3040 (LA 3040) runs  in a northwest to southeast direction from LA 24 in Bayou Cane to LA 661 in Houma.  The route formerly had a spur that traveled  along South Hollywood Road to a junction with LA 24 in Houma.

LA 3040 travels southeast from LA 24 in Bayou Cane and runs parallel to that route into the Houma city limits, where it becomes known as Martin Luther King Boulevard.  Crossing South Hollywood Road, the local name changes to West Tunnel Boulevard.  The route then curves eastward and divides onto the one-way pair of Honduras and Bond Streets as it passes just south of the downtown area.  After about a dozen blocks, the travel lanes of LA 3040 converge, and the roadway passes through a tunnel underneath the Gulf Intracoastal Waterway.  On the other side, LA 3040 continues as East Tunnel Boulevard and turns northeast across LA 57 (Grand Caillou Road) to its terminus at LA 661 (Howard Avenue).

Louisiana Highway 3041

Louisiana Highway 3042

Louisiana Highway 3043

Louisiana Highway 3044

Louisiana Highway 3045

Louisiana Highway 3046

Louisiana Highway 3048

Louisiana Highway 3049

Louisiana Highway 3049 (LA 3049) runs  in a north–south direction from the concurrent US 71/LA 1 in Shreveport to a second junction with US 71 in Gilliam, Caddo Parish.

References

External links
La DOTD State, District, and Parish Maps